The estreleira is the flag used by Galician nationalists of left-of-centre to far-left ideological allegiance.

This flag merges the Galician national flag (a blue band on a white background) with a red star (a symbol of communism created in the Soviet Union in the early 20th century). The estreleira flag was created by communist activists of the UPG (Unión do Povo Galego) in the 1960s, correlating the red star to the stars in the flags of many Socialist countries, in particular Yugoslavia.

All the  nationalist left-wing political parties of Galicia (BNG, AGE, FPG, CERNA, Nós-Unidade Popular, Causa Galiza, ...) use the Estreleira flag as a party symbol. It's also used by the left-wing nationalist trade unions (such as CIG or CUT).

It doesn't have exact size, and the red star in the middle sometimes goes aligned with the blue band. Other examples of Socialist-inspired flags within nationalist movements are the Catalan (estelada) and the Occitan flag .

See also
Flag of Galicia

References

Flags of Spain